Gorsian Nihal commonly known as Chuggian is a very small village in Nurmahal.  Nurmahal is a sub tehsil in the city Jalandhar of Indian state of Punjab.

About 
Gorsian Nihal is almost 8 km from Nurmahal. The nearest main road to Gorsian Nihal is Nurmahal-Talwan road which is almost 4 km from the village. The nearest Railway station to this village is Nurmahal Railway station.

Post code & STD code 
Gorsian Nihal's Post office is Ramewal whose post code is 144039 & its STD code is 01826.

References

A Punjabi website showing Gorsian Nihal's Details

  Official website of Punjab Govt. with Gorsian Nihal's details

Villages in Jalandhar district